Life Is Beautiful is a 2012 Indian Telugu-language coming-of-age drama film written, produced and directed by Sekhar Kammula. The film features five debutants namely, Abijeet, Sudhakar Komakula, Kaushik Darbha, Shagun Kaur, and Zara Shah in lead roles with Shriya Saran, Anjala Zaveri and Amala Akkineni in key supporting roles. This film also features Vijay Devarakonda, Sree Vishnu & Naveen Polisetty. The film is produced by Sekhar Kammula and Chandrasekhar Kammula under Amigos Creations banner. Soundtrack of the film was composed by Mickey J Meyer and the cinematography was handled by Vijay C. Kumar. The film received mixed to positive reviews from critics and audiences.

Plot

Srinu (Abhijeet) is a college student who has two sisters, Satya (Rashmi Shastry) and Chinni (Kavya). Srinu's widowed mother (Amala) asks her children to move to their uncle's house in Hyderabad as she got a job transfer. Amma promises to Chinni that she will return in exactly one year. The area in which Srinu's uncle lives is divided into two areas: the luxurious Gold-phase and the lower class B-phase. Srinu's uncle lives in B-phase along with Srinu's Aunt, brother-in-law and sister-in-law, grandfather and grandmother.

B-phase is filled with love and humble people including Nagaraj (Sudhakar Komakula), the B-phase "gang" leader, Abhi (Kaushik Darbha), the small-sized geek, Lakshmi (Zara Shah), who is new to B-phase, and Paddu (Gurshagun Kaur), who is also Srinu's 2nd-cousin. Paddu's parents, however, are wealthy and her mother (Surekha Vani) is arrogant. Nagaraj's father is frustrated with his son as he has no job and always roams around B-phase. Gold-phase is filled with arrogant rich people who have no compassion towards the lower class B-phase. Some of them are Rakesh (Naveen Polishetty), Gold-phase "gang" leader, short tempered Suresh (Sanjeev), and Ajay (Vijay Devarakonda). Paru (Shriya Saran), the belle and Suresh's girlfriend, is also part of Gold-phase, but unlike her neighbors, she is sympathetic towards B-phase.

Srinu soon faces the Gold-phase rogues and gets into a brawl with them. At this juncture, it is revealed that Abhi is attracted to Paru, which angers Suresh. Chinni and her grandfather are insulted when a prestigious private school denies Chinni admission, citing her inability to speak English. Her grandfather challenges the school officials and motivates Chinni to learn English. Over time, Srinu and Paddu get close while Nagaraj tries to get close to Lakshmi.

Meanwhile, Maya madam (Anjala Zaveri), the B-phase belle, is being harassed by an anonymous caller. Srinu, Nagaraj, and Abhi find out who he is and catch him. After Maya madam beats the caller, he reveals that he is from Gold-phase. At this juncture, Maya madam thanks the boys and acquaints with them. Meanwhile, the caller brings the Gold-phase gang along and a fight starts, which Maya madam breaks up.

Annoyed with Maya madam, the Gold-phase gang tries to get pictures of her in the bathroom with a camera fitted toy drone but fail to do so. However, while fiddling around with it, they discover Srinu's brother-in-law, Ashok (Vishnuvardhan), and Rakesh's sister, Sony (Srimukhi), together. They confront the B-phase gang about it and warn them to get Ashok to back-off. However, Ashok brings Sony to his house, intending to marry her. The next morning, Rakesh, his father, and the Gold-phase gang come with the police to Ashok's house to have Ashok arrested. But Srinu's uncle (Ashok's father), who is a lawyer, settles the matter citing Sony's consent.

Despite the struggle, Ashok's and Sony's marriage is conducted in a simple manner at Ashok's house. From Gold-phase, only Paru shows up to the marriage reception and becomes acquainted with Abhi, which annoys Suresh. She also reveals that she is competing in the Miss India contest. At the reception, Ajay, who came with Suresh and Paru, sees Lakshmi and is immediately attracted to her. Ajay offers Lakshmi a job through Nagaraj, which she accepts as she needs money to pay for her engineering entrance exams. In order to provide a room for the married couple, Srinu is asked to move to Paddu's family's outhouse, which helps Srinu and Paddu spend more time together. Angry at Ashok's and Sony's marriage, Rakesh vows to retaliate.

Meanwhile, the parents of Gold-phase rogues plan to usurp the local lake, which geographically belongs to B-phase, after finding out that B-phase people have been using the lake, which connects B-phase to Gold-phase, to sneak into Gold-phase. Rakesh starts retaliating by temporarily cutting power supply and water supply to B-phase. This only brings the B-phase families closer, as the families start sharing food and water and spend more time with each other.

Meanwhile, Abhi's dog wanders off into Gold-phase as it is attracted to Paru's dog. The Gold-phase rogues trap Abhi's dog and unleash their dogs onto Abhi's dog. When Srinu and Abhi go to retrieve Abhi's dog they are beaten up by the Gold-phase rogues. This again turns in B-phase's favor when Paru visits Abhi to apologize. Paru also asks Abhi to teach her magic so that she can it show off as her talent at the Miss India prelims. Jealous over Paru's closeness with Abhi, Suresh talks to Rakesh, who then starts his next revenge.

Rakesh reveals to Paru's parents about her closeness with Abhi. Eventually things get worse when one of Satya's classmates, Manish (Charan Akula), makes a move on her and gives her a phone, seemingly planned by Rakesh. Ajay also starts moving closer with Lakshmi, which troubles Nagaraj. Chinni starts showing signs of missing her mother. When Gold-phase starts taking over the lake, B-phase manages to get a stay order through Srinu's uncle. Following this, Srinu states that Gold-phase is harassing them only because they appear vulnerable. Srinu proposes that they compete in every way possible with Gold-phase and the friends decide that Paddu will participate in the Miss India prelims.

Paddu's mother, who is keeping a close watch over her after finding about her closeness with Srinu, initially refuses to let her participate but agrees when Paddu agrees to see prospective grooms. Srinu finds about this and, distraught, distances himself from Paddu, which troubles Paddu. Nagaraj is also frustrated that Ajay is moving closer to Lakshmi. He also attempts to learn English through Chinni.

Paru invites Abhi to the beauty contest and during the journey, Paru and Abhi share each other's feelings. The rest of the B-phase friends also go to the contest as Paddu's guests. At the contest, Paddu feels overwhelmed and leaves the contest. She confides in Srinu that she is sad because he has been ignoring her and proposes to him, which he accepts. Paru inadvertently reveals her feelings for Abhi through one of her magic acts in front of everyone and goes on to win the prelims.

While returning, Suresh and Rakesh confront Paru about her feelings for Abhi and state that rich should only use the poor and not acquaint with them. Disgusted, Paru leaves them and returns along with the B-phase friends. However, upon returning, Paru's father asks her not to see Abhi anymore and she reluctantly obeys.

Later, Nagaraj proposes to Lakshmi but she refuses saying that he is unambitious and irresponsible while she aspires to become an engineer. She again starts addressing Nagaraj formally in order to suppress his feelings for her. Dejected, Nagaraj confides in Srinu and Abhi. Abhi also explains that Paru has not been in contact for a while and convinces Srinu and Nagaraj to help him talk to Paru. That night the trio sneaks over to Gold-phase and Abhi manages to talk to Paru. She explains that she is not confident enough to spend a lifetime with him and is not ready to marry him. But when Abhi asks if her affection towards Abhi was just a Gold-phase plan to hurt Abhi, she slaps him, indicating that she truly loved him.

Tensions between the two areas worsen on Lakshmi's birthday when Ajay proposes to Lakshmi and accidentally hurts her when she refuses. Furious, Nagaraj starts to beat up Ajay when everyone in the Gold-phase gang and the B-phase gang get involved. The police arrive and break up the fight. Rakesh files an attempt to murder case on Nagaraj, Srinu, and Abhi and bribes the police. However, Maya madam comes to their rescue with Lakshmi and files an attempt to rape case on Ajay. The police convince Rakesh to drop the charges in order to keep everyone out of trouble.

While returning home, Srinu inquires Lakshmi about Satya, who apparently said was going to Lakshmi's birthday party. When Lakshmi denies any knowledge Srinu asks Paddu to check on Satya. Paddu confirms Satya is home safe. While a confused Srinu is talking to Paddu about why Satya would lie to him, Paddu's mother discovers them and furiously throws Srinu out of her house. As Srinu returns to his uncle's house, he finds Satya talking on the phone with Manish.

The next morning, Srinu, along with Nagaraj, Abhi, and the rest of the B-phase gang, confront Manish and beat him up. Satya intervenes and sends Manish away. In a heated argument with Srinu, she confesses that she doesn't want to continue her studies as she feels overwhelmed. After Abhi escorts Satya away, Srinu confides in his uncle about everything that has happened and decides to visit Amma to tell her about everything that's been going on.

Srinu, his uncle, Satya, Abhi, and Nagaraj leave in Nagaraj's dad's car to visit Amma. Srinu's uncle takes them to a hospital where they find out that Amma has cancer. Doctors inform them that Amma stopped her treatment worried that the expenditure will eat into the money saved for her children's studies but that the treatment could cure Amma. The group decides not to tell Amma of the events and leave after having an emotional talk with Amma.

Upon returning, Srinu and Satya hide the truth from Chinni and focus on their education. Abhi's love towards his mother grows and he lets her pinch his cheeks (which he actually hates). Nagaraj's father, however, is angry that Nagaraj took his car without telling him, which has left him without any earnings (as he uses it as a taxi), and kicks Nagaraj out of the house, and gives him an ultimatum to return only if he finds a way of earning money. Nagaraj has always been interested in starting his own small business, which proves difficult as he can't figure out what he should do and can do.

Paddu's and Srinu's relationship seems to be falling apart as Srinu wants to focus more on his education and his sisters. Nagaraj also has been distancing himself from Lakshmi, which is difficult for her to cope with. Maya madam again comes to the aid and suggests that Nagaraj start his own cab service with the cars that her friend is selling, which cost Rs. 3 lakhs in total. Maya madam helps Nagaraj with Rs. 2 lakhs. Lakshmi talks to Nagaraj and tells him she is not happy without him and starts calling him informally again to rekindle their friendship. She also provides Nagaraj with the jewelry that her father has been saving up for her marriage, which is worth Rs. 1 lakh.

Nagaraj successfully starts his cab service under the name of 'Laxmi', the only word he can spell in English. Having realized how much Nagaraj loves her, Lakshmi reciprocates her love. Abhi changes back into his old nerdy self, Lakshmi and Satya write their examinations well, and Srinu earns his degree and gets a job. When everything seems to be going well, doctors from Amma's hospital call and inform that Amma's condition is deteriorating and request Srinu to come immediately. Before leaving for the hospital, Srinu goes to Paddu's house and asks her parents for her hand in marriage. Although Paddu's mother refuses, Paddu speaks up and tells her that she wants to be with Srinu, which convinces Paddu's father who lets her go with Srinu. Srinu, Paddu, Nagaraj, and Abhi go to the hospital, where Srinu informs Amma that he got a job and Satya wrote her exams well, and also introduces Paddu. Feeling confident that her children can settle down, Amma resumes her treatment.

Chinni participates in an English-speaking competition against a student from the convent school where she was denied admission earlier, with judges and audience from both sides present. When Chinni is asked to tell about her mother in English, she speaks in English initially but has an emotional breakdown and continues to describe how much she loves her mother and how much she misses her now in Telugu, which moves everyone there to tears, including the judges from the convent school who decide Chinni win the competition. But Chinni, now that 1 year has passed, insists on seeing her mother who returns after successful treatment.

Srinu feels nostalgic over the memories he earned through his time in B-phase. He meets with Rakesh and thanks him for troubling him, claiming that the Gold-phase harassment has given their lives completeness with both sweetness and spice. Rakesh thanks Srinu in return claiming that B-phase made him realize that wealth does not provide one with true happiness. Rakesh and Srinu shake each other's hands. Nagaraj's father hugs his son and welcomes him back. Paru visits Abhi and asks how he's been doing, to which Abhi says that he is just happy because everyone else is happy. But when she asks if he has been missing her, Abhi gives a speechless look. With this, Paru leaves feeling happy for Abhi and B-phase. In the end, Chinni asks her mother do they really have to go back. Everyone asks the family to stay, to which the family agrees.

Cast

 Abijeet as Srinu
 Sudhakar Komakula as Nagaraj
 Kaushik Darbha as Abhi
Sree Vishnu as Ashok
 Shagun Kaur as Paddu
 Zara Shah as Lakshmi
 Rashmi Shastry as Sathya
 Kavya as Chinni
 Naveen Polishetty as Rakesh
 Shriya Saran as Parvati (Paru)
 Anjala Zaveri as Maya
 Amala Akkineni as Amma
 Vijay Deverakonda as Ajay
 Surekha Vani
 Appaji Ambarisha Darbha as Bridegroom's father
 Sanjeev
 Sriram
 Sreemukhi as Sonia 
 Charan Akula as Manish (Sathya's BF)
 Akshay Neelakantham as Maya's SMS Friend
 Rajasekhar Sanku as Paru's father
 Eesha Rebba as Harini
 Tejaswi Madivada as cameo in Life is Beautiful Song

Production
In August 2010, media reports emerged that Sekhar Kammula registered the title Life Is Beautiful at the film chamber and would make the movie with Varun Sandesh. Seven months after his movie Leader was released, Sekhar officially announced that his next project was titled Life Is Beautiful and would star newcomers. On 3 September 2010, he announced a star hunt in association with Vodafone India and Radio Mirchi that would help him find the lead actors for the movie. In April 2011, it was announced that after almost 8 months of auditions and casting, the lead cast was finalized. After multiple delays, filming finally began in June 2011. In February 2012, it was reported that one of the film's lead actress walked out of the project after shooting for almost six months. It was reported that Shriya Saran was cast in the film to replace the actor. Singer Sunitha Upadrashta who has given voice to most of Shekar's earlier films had provide her voice to actress Shriya Saran. It was announced that a gated community set worth 1 crore was built under the supervision of art director Thotta Tharani. In May 2012, it was reported that the filming was finally completed. On 6 July 2012, a press meet was held in Hyderabad where the cast was introduced and the first look of the film was launched.
During an interview it was revealed that the director approached actress Sai Pallavi for the lead role but she eventually refused the offer to pursue her medical degree in Georgia .

Release
Although initial reports suggested that the film would release in early 2012, delays in filming and production pushed back the film release. In July 2012, it was announced that the film would release in August. The film was released worldwide on 14 September 2012 with premier shows in USA on 13 September.

Pre-release revenues
In October 2011, it was announced that Ficus Inc had acquired the overseas theatrical distribution rights of the film. It was reported that the satellite rights of the film were sold to MAA TV for 3.5 crores.

Critical reception
The film received mixed to positive reviews from critics and audiences, many critics compared the film to Sekhar's directional previous Telugu film Happy Days. DNA India wrote:"Sekhar Kammula has delivered again with Life is Beautiful. Yes, the film is a bit too long and there are many scenes that could have been edited out or even shot better – but all said and done... the three-hour long tale leaves you smiling, gushing and crying at several intervals. You leave the theatre feeling better about the world and thankful for the smallest joys in life – which we think is more than what Sekhar Kammula could have asked for". CNN-IBN wrote:"The plot lacked continuity and was heading in different directions before finally arriving at a cliched climax". Oneindia wrote:"It has a good story and performances but suffers from dragging narration". 123telugu wrote:"A brilliant performance from Amala in the climax and a few good scenes are the film’s assets. Bad screenplay, excessive length and lack of entertainment will work against the film". Idlebrain wrote:"The plus points are Sekhar’s trade mark beautiful moments, casting, dialogues, direction and a strong mother sentiment. On the flip side, a better background music and shorter runtime would have helped the film further. On a whole, Life is Beautiful is a good movie".

Soundtrack

The soundtrack of the film was composed by Mickey J Meyer. Mickey previously worked with Sekhar for Happy Days and Leader. The audio of the film was released on 27 July 2012 at Marriott Hotel in Hyderabad through Aditya Music label. Lyrics for the songs were penned by Anantha Sreeram and Vanamali. The music premier of the album was held at Radio Mirchi where the songs were played for the first time for public hearing.

Awards

References

External links
Official website
 

2012 films
Films scored by Mickey J Meyer
Films directed by Sekhar Kammula
2010s Telugu-language films
2012 comedy-drama films
Indian romantic comedy-drama films
Indian coming-of-age comedy-drama films
2012 romantic comedy-drama films
2010s coming-of-age comedy-drama films